Kvalø is a Norwegian surname. Notable people with the surname include:

Jorunn Kvalø (born 1975), Norwegian racing cyclist
Steiner Arvid Kvalø (1922–2015), Norwegian politician

Norwegian-language surnames